Thetus Willrette Sims (April 25, 1852 – December 17, 1939) was an American politician and a member of the United States House of Representatives for the 8th congressional district of Tennessee.

Biography
Sims was born on April 25, 1852 near Waynesboro, Tennessee in Wayne County son of George Washington and Sarah Jane Whitson Sims. He attended a private school at Martin Mills and moved with his parents to Savannah, Tennessee in Hardin County in 1862 during the Civil War.

Sims attended Savannah (Tennessee) College and graduated from Cumberland School of Law at Cumberland University in Lebanon, Tennessee in June 1876. He was admitted to the bar the same year.  He married Nannie Kitrell on December 26, 1877, and they had seven children, Edna, Erskine, Tom, Elizabeth, Marie, Paul, and Enid.

Career
Sims commenced practice in Linden, Tennessee in Perry County. He was the superintendent of public instruction for Perry County, Tennessee from 1882 to 1884.

Sims was elected to the House in the fall of 
1896 as a Democrat.  He was reelected to the eleven succeeding Congresses. 
 1897–1899 - 55th Congress Freshman term in the House.
 1911–1913 - 62nd Congress He was the chairman of the United States House Committee on War Claims.
 1917–1919 - 65th Congress He was the chairman of the United States House Committee on Interstate and Foreign Commerce. 
 1920 - He failed to win the election in 1920 for the 67th Congress (1921–1923).
His tenure in the House lasted for 12 terms in office from March 4, 1897 to March 3, 1921.

An important advocate for the nineteenth amendment which gave women the right to vote. Tennessee was also the last state to ratify the nineteenth amendment.

Pushed for the Sims Act, which forbade interstate transportation of fight films, primarily boxing after the Johnson v Flynn fight in 1912.  The act was known as the first time Congress took censorship action in regards to films and remained on the book until 1940.

Returning to Lexington, Tennessee in Henderson County, Sims resumed the practice of law for a few years. He retired from active business pursuits in 1930 shortly after the beginning of the Great Depression and returned to Washington, D.C.

Death
Sims died on  In Washington, D.C. He is interred at Rock Creek Cemetery in Washington, D.C. He was the father-in-law of politician Louis Brownlow.

References

External links
 

1852 births
1939 deaths
People from Savannah, Tennessee
Burials at Rock Creek Cemetery
People from Wayne County, Tennessee
Cumberland School of Law alumni
Democratic Party members of the United States House of Representatives from Tennessee
People from Lexington, Tennessee
People from Perry County, Tennessee